Antigua and Barbuda competed at the 2018 Commonwealth Games in the Gold Coast, Australia from April 4 to April 15, 2018.  It was Antigua and Barbua's 10th appearance at the Commonwealth Games.

Competitors
The following is the list of number of competitors that participated at the Games per sport/discipline.

Athletics

Antigua and Barbuda participated with 7 athletes (5 men and 2 women).

Men
Track & road events

Women
Field events

Boxing

Antigua and Barbuda participated with 2 athletes (2 men).

Men

Cycling

Antigua and Barbuda participated with 2 athletes (2 men).

Road
Men

Shooting

Antigua and Barbuda participated with 2 athletes (2 men).

Open

Swimming

Antigua and Barbuda participated with 4 athletes (2 men and 2 women).

Men

Women

See also
Antigua and Barbuda at the 2018 Summer Youth Olympics

References

Nations at the 2018 Commonwealth Games
Antigua and Barbuda at the Commonwealth Games
2018 in Antigua and Barbuda sport